Misterioso means mysterious in the Italian language, and in the context of written music, is an instruction to the performer to play the music in a mysterious mood. It may also refer to:

 "Misterioso", a composition by jazz pianist Thelonious Monk and the title for two of his albums
 Misterioso (Thelonious Monk album), 1958
 Misterioso (Recorded on Tour), 1965
 Misterioso, a 1991 TV film with Suzan Sylvester and Jack Shepherd, in which the eponymous Monk piece features prominently; aired as part of The Play on One series on BBC One.
 Misterioso (Paul Motian album), 1987
 Misterioso (wrestler) (born 1966), Mexican-American professional wrestler
 Misterioso, Jr., Mexican masked professional wrestler
 Misterioso (novel), by Arne Dahl
 Misterioso (film), a TV film based on the novel